Poland competed at the 1976 Winter Olympics in Innsbruck, Austria.

Alpine skiing

Men

Biathlon

Men

 1 One minute added per close miss (a hit in the outer ring), two minutes added per complete miss.

Men's 4 x 7.5 km relay

 2 A penalty loop of 200 metres had to be skied per missed target.

Cross-country skiing

Men

Men's 4 × 10 km relay

Women

Women's 4 × 5 km relay

Figure skating

Women

Ice Dancing

Ice hockey

First round
Winners (in bold) entered the Medal Round. Other teams played a consolation round for 7th-12th places.

|}

Medal round

West Germany 7-4 Poland
USSR 16-1 Poland
Poland 1-0* Czechoslovakia
USA 7-2 Poland
Finland 7-1 Poland

* Note: The score after the Czechoslovakia vs Poland match was 7-1, but due to the positive doping test of one of the Czechoslovakian players, the team was recorded a 0-1 loss. Poland didn't receive any points.

Team Roster
Walery Kosyl
Andrzej Tkacz
Robert Góralczyk
Andrzej Iskrzycki
Kordian Jajszczok
Marek Marcińczak
Jerzy Potz
Andrzej Słowakiewicz
Stefan Chowaniec
Mieczysław Jaskierski
Wiesław Jobczyk
Marian Kajzerek
Leszek Kokoszka
Tadeusz Obłój
Henryk Pytel
Andrzej Zabawa
Walenty Ziętara
Karol Żurek

Luge

Men

(Men's) Doubles

Women

Nordic combined 

Events:
 normal hill ski jumping 
 15 km cross-country skiing

Ski jumping

Speed skating

Women

References
Official Olympic Reports
 Olympic Winter Games 1976, full results by sports-reference.com

Nations at the 1976 Winter Olympics
1976
1976 in Polish sport